In Greek mythology, Aeolus or Aiolos is a name shared by three mythical characters. These three personages are often difficult to tell apart, and even the ancient mythographers appear to have been perplexed about which Aeolus was which. Diodorus Siculus made an attempt to define each of these three (although it is clear that he also became muddled), and his opinion is followed here. 
 The first Aeolus was a son of Hellen and the eponymous founder of the Aeolian race.
 The second Aeolus was a son of Poseidon, who led a colony to islands in the Tyrrhenian Sea.
 The third Aeolus was a son of Hippotes who is mentioned in the Odyssey and the Aeneid as the ruler of the winds.

All three men named Aeolus appear to be connected genealogically, although the precise relationship, especially regarding the second and third Aeolus, is often ambiguous as their identities seem to have been merged by many ancient writers.

Aeolus was also the name of the following minor characters:
 Aeolus, a defender of Thebes in the war of the Seven against Thebes. He was killed by Parthenopaeus.
 Aeolus, a Trojan companion of Aeneas in Italy, where he was killed by Turnus, King of the Rutulians. Aeolus was the father of Clytius and Misenus.

See also
Aeolia (mythical island), island kingdom of Aeolus, ruler of the winds

Notes

References 
 Apollodorus, Apollodorus, The Library, with an English Translation by Sir James George Frazer, F.B.A., F.R.S. in 2 Volumes. Cambridge, Massachusetts, Harvard University Press; London, William Heinemann Ltd. 1921. . Online version at the Perseus Digital Library.
 Hyginus, Gaius Julius, Fabulae, in The Myths of Hyginus, edited and translated by Mary A. Grant, Lawrence: University of Kansas Press, 1960. Online version at ToposText.
 Homer, The Odyssey with an English Translation by A.T. Murray, PH.D. in two volumes. Cambridge, Massachusetts, Harvard University Press; London, William Heinemann, Ltd. 1919. Online version at the Perseus Digital Library.
  Kerényi, Karl, The Gods of the Greeks,  Thames and Hudson, London, 1951. Internet Archive.
 Parada, Carlos, Genealogical Guide to Greek Mythology, Jonsered, Paul Åströms Förlag, 1993. .
 Rose, H. J., s.v. Aeolus (2) in the Oxford Classical Dictionary, second edition,  Hammond, N.G.L. and Howard Hayes Scullard (editors), Oxford University Press, 1992. .
 Smith, William, Dictionary of Greek and Roman Biography and Mythology, London (1873). Online version at the Perseus Digital Library.
 Statius, Statius with an English Translation by J. H. Mozley, Volume II, Thebaid, Books V–XII, Achilleid, Loeb Classical Library No. 207, London: William Heinemann, Ltd., New York: G. P. Putnamm's Sons, 1928. . Internet Archive.
 Thomas, Richard. F., "The Isolation of Turnus, Aeneid, book 12", in Vergil's Aeneid: Augustan Epic and Political Context, Hans-Peter Stahl (ed.), Classical Press of Wales, pp. 271–303. .
 Virgil, Aeneid, Theodore C. Williams. trans. Boston. Houghton Mifflin Co. 1910. Online version at the Perseus Digital Library.
 de Weever, Jaqueline, Chaucer Name Dictionary, Garland Publishing, Inc., New York and London, 1988, 1996.

Trojans
Characters in the Aeneid
Characters in Seven against Thebes